And That on Monday Morning is a 1959 West German comedy film directed by Luigi Comencini and starring O.W. Fischer, Ulla Jacobsson and Vera Tschechowa . Based on the 1955 British play Mr. Kettle and Mrs. Moon by J. B. Priestley, it was entered into the 9th Berlin International Film Festival. It was shot at the Spandau Studios in Berlin. The film's sets were designed by the art directors Helmut Nentwig and Ernst Schomer.

Cast
 O. W. Fischer as Alois Kessel
 Ulla Jacobsson as Delia Mond
 Vera Tschechowa as Monika
 Robert Graf as Herbert Acker
 Werner Finck as Prof. Gross
 Reinhard Kolldehoff as Herr Müller
 Blandine Ebinger as Frau Präfke
 Lotte Stein as Frau Mutz
 Siegfried Schürenberg as Herr von Schmitz
 Manfred Grothe as Sekretär
 Inge Wolffberg as Patientin
 Elvira Schalcher as Sekretärin
 Kaete Alving as Frau Mond
 Sigurd Lohde as Dr. Mond
 Herbert Weissbach as Herr Wegeleben

References

Bibliography
 Bock, Hans-Michael & Bergfelder, Tim. The Concise Cinegraph: Encyclopaedia of German Cinema. Berghahn Books, 2009.

External links

1959 films
1959 romantic comedy films
German romantic comedy films
West German films
1950s German-language films
German black-and-white films
Films directed by Luigi Comencini
German films based on plays
Films shot at Spandau Studios
1950s German films